Hoogland is a village and former free-standing municipality in the province of Utrecht in the Netherlands. The village population is 10,587 people (2006).

Since 1974, Hoogland has been a part of the municipality of Amersfoort. Until that time, around the 1950s, Hoogland grew vastly in the areas Langenoord and Bieshaar. Nowadays, Hoogland-west is the only outer part of Hoogland which is uncultivated. Although Hoogland got more surrounded by the new housing of Amersfoort (Kattenbroek, Nieuwland and Schothorst), the village characteristics stayed intact.

Hoogland is located north of the Amersfoort city centre.

Although the new housing within Hoogland, the most residents are young. The average income is higher than the average income of Amersfoort and there live relatively few immigrants. The residents characterize Hoogland as a fine and good place to live. Especially the connection and togetherness are one of the most shared feelings. They give Hoogland a 7,6, which is better than the average from Amersfoort.
ummers’.

Community school
Hoogland has six primary schools: De Biezen, de Bieshaar, de Berkenschool, De Horizon, de Kosmos and the Langenoord. The schools ‘De Biezen’ and ‘de Bieshaar’ are in front of each other. The ‘Biezen’ is a Roman Catholic school and the ‘Bieshaar’ is a public school. The ‘Berkenschool’ lies in front of the ‘Berkenvijver’ (a pond). The ‘Langenoord’ lies in the part which is called ‘Langenoord’. The ‘Horizon’ is a Reformed school. The ’Kosmos’ is the school which is in the outer corner of Hoogland.

External links 
Hoogland Online

Former municipalities of Utrecht (province)
Populated places in Utrecht (province)
Amersfoort